Thomas Hart or Tom Hart may refer to:

Sportsmen
 Tom Hart (sportscaster), sports announcer
 Tommy Hart (born 1944), American football player
 Tom Hart (baseball) (1869–1939), 19th-century baseball player
 Tom Hart (Australian footballer) (born 1896), Australian rules footballer
 Thomas Hart (civil servant) (1909–2001), Scottish cricket and rugby union international
Thomas Hart (rugby league), see List of Castleford Tigers players

Politics
 Thomas N. Hart (1829–1927), mayor of Boston, 1889–1890 and 1900–1902
 Thomas Hart (North Carolina politician), senator from Orange County, N.C., in the North Carolina General Assembly of 1777
Thomas Hart (New York politician), in 29th New York State Legislature
Thomas Hart (chief of staff) from Jack Abramoff
Thomas Hart (mayor of Davenport) from History of Davenport, Iowa
Tom Hart (Australian politician) (1904–1972), member of the Legislative Assembly of Western Australia

Others
 Thomas C. Hart (1877–1971), U.S. naval admiral and Senator
 Tom Hart (businessman), Scottish businessman, former chairman of Hibernian F.C., see Willie MacFarlane (footballer born 1930)
 Tom Hart (cartoonist) (born 1969), U.S. comics creator
Thomas Hart, character in Hart's War
Thomas Hart (Shakespeare) from Shakespeare's Birthplace
Thomas Hart (screenwriter) for Care Bears: Oopsy Does It!
Tom Hart (literary agent) from Amelia Atwater-Rhodes

See also
 Thomas Hart Benton (disambiguation)